is a Japanese male's personal name; used increasingly as a female's personal name, as a shortening of Keiko.

Possible writings
Kei can be written using different kanji characters and can mean:
, "square jewel"
, "blessing"
, "wise"
, "jubilation"
, "respect"
, "excellent"
, "Japanese Judas-tree"
, "disclose"
, "silicon"

The name can also be written in hiragana or katakana.

People with the name
, Japanese singer
, Japanese-American jazz pianist
, Japanese manga artist
, Japanese actress
, Japanese footballer
Kei Cozzolino (born 1987), Japanese-born Italian racing driver
, Japanese manga artist
, Japanese actress, cinematographer, editor, writer and film director
, Japanese footballer
, Japanese footballer
, Japanese football manager and coach
, Japanese shogi player
, Japanese actor and film director
, Japanese actor and musician
, Japanese baseball player
, Japanese basketball player
, Japanese baseball player
, Japanese footballer
, Japanese singer and actor
, Japanese footballer
, Japanese photographer and installation artist
, Japanese idol and singer
, better known as Kobametal, Japanese music producer
, Japanese footballer
, Japanese film director
, Japanese manga artist
, Japanese synchronized swimmer
, Japanese footballer
, Japanese adult film actress
, Japanese film director
, Japanese footballer
, Japanese footballer
, Japanese writer and academic
, Japanese tennis player
, Japanese baseball player
, Japanese singer-songwriter and composer
, Japanese footballer
, Japanese photographer
, Japanese businesswoman
Kei Pilz (died 2001), Japanese chef
, Japanese speed skater
, Japanese manga artist
, Japanese actor
, Japanese comedian
, Japanese voice actress
, Japanese footballer
, Japanese actor
, Japanese actor
, Japanese luger
, Japanese sprinter
, Japanese dancer
, Japanese television personality and motoring journalist
, Japanese actor
, Japanese comedian, actor and musician
, Japanese footballer
, Japanese actor, voice actor and narrator
Kei Tomozawa (born 1999), American soccer player
, Japanese manga artist
, Japanese footballer
, Japanese footballer
, Japanese actor
, Japanese singer, musician and actress
, Japanese actor and voice actor

Other people
Kei (singer) (birthname Kim Ji-yeon, born 1995), South Korean singer of the girl group Lovelyz
Kei Kamara (born 1984), Sierra Leonean footballer
Kei Miller (born 1978), Jamaican poet and writer
Kei Nakano, Japanese gutarist, Associate professor of Osaka University Of Arts

Fictional characters
, protagonist of the manga series Akira
, a character in the manga series Dirty Pair
, a character in the anime series Girls und Panzer
, a character in the manga series Prétear
Kei, a character in the film Moon Child
Cyberdoll Kei, a character in the anime series Hand Maid May
, the protagonist of the light novel series Sagrada Reset
, a character in the light novel series Yumemiru Danshi wa Genjitsushugisha
, a character in the video game Tokimeki Memorial Girl's Side
, a character in the light novel series Classroom of the Elite
, a character in the manga series Gantz
, a character in the manga series Flying Witch
, a character in the manga series Gantz
, the protagonist of the anime series Please Teacher!
, a character in the PS2 video game Forbidden Siren
, a character in the video game series Ace Combat
, a character in the light novel Boogiepop and Others
, a character in the manga series Yuyushiki
, protagonist of the visual novel PureMail
, a character in the visual novel Ef: A Fairy Tale of the Two
, a character in the manga series Kaguya-sama: Love Is War
, a character in the manga series S · A: Special A
, a character in the anime series Soar High! Isami
, a character in the manga series Haikyu!! with the position of middle blocker from Karasuno High
, the protagonist of the manga series The Day of Revolution
, a character in the manga series Space Pirate Captain Harlock

References

Japanese unisex given names